Ctenacanthoidea is an extinct superfamily of prehistoric Elasmobranchs. These nectonic carnivores first appeared around 407 million years ago, during the Devonian, and survived until the early Cretaceous. A Miocene record, Wodnika ocoyae, is now considered a concretion. Fossils belonging to this group have been found worldwide.

References

Prehistoric cartilaginous fish taxa